Osama Al-Muwallad (born 15 May 1984) is a retired Saudi Arabian football (soccer) player who played as a defender for Al Ittihad his entire career.

He played for Al-Ittihad in the 2005 FIFA Club World Cup and has played several times for the Saudi Arabia national football team, including playing at the 2003 FIFA World Youth Championship in the United Arab Emirates.

International goals

Honours

Al-Ittihad Jeddah
Saudi Premier League : 2000, 2001, 2003, 2007, 2009
Saudi Crown Prince Cup : 2001, 2004
Saudi Champions Cup : 2010, 2013
AFC Champions League : 2004, 2005
Arab Champions League : 2005
Saudi-Egyptian Super Cup : 2001, 2003

National team
Gulf Cup of Nations
2010 : Runner up

References

1984 births
Living people
Saudi Arabian footballers
Saudi Arabia international footballers
Ittihad FC players
2011 AFC Asian Cup players
Sportspeople from Jeddah
Saudi Professional League players
Association football defenders